The 1993 Arab Athletics Championships was the eighth edition of the international athletics competition between Arab countries. It took place in Latakia, Syria from 24 to 27 September. A total of 40 athletics events were contested, 23 for men and 17 for women.

The men's marathon was replaced by the half marathon at this edition – a change which later became the standard at the competition. It was the last time that the 3000 metres was on the programme; it was the only women's long-distance running event here. The women's 400 metres hurdles was dropped from the programme due to a lack of entries.

Medal summary

Men

Women

Medal table

Overall

Men

Women

References

Results
 Al Batal Al Arabi(N°:38). Arab Athletics Union. Retrieved on 2015-02-14.

Arab Athletics Championships
Arab Athletics Championships, 1993
Sport in Latakia
Arab Athletics Championships
Arab Athletics Championships
Arab Athletics Championships